Overheard may refer to:

 Overheard (film), 2009 Hong Kong crime thriller film
Overheard 2,  2011 Hong Kong crime thriller film, sequel to the 2009 film Overheard
 Overheard (Kyle XY), an episode of the television show Kyle XY
 Overheard in New York, a humor blog based in New York City
 Overheard in Pittsburgh, its Pittsburgh counterpart